Mladen Veža (7 February 1916 – 19 February 2010) was a Croatian painter. He was born in Brist. He graduated from the Zagreb's Academy of Fine Arts under Vladimir Becić in 1937. He subsequently taught at the academy until 1981. In 1938 he was part of the first exhibition at the Home of Fine Arts Half a Century of Croatian Art, which was blessed by Archbishop Alojzije Stepinac and opened by Vladko Maček. He also took part in the IV Exhibition of Croatian Artists from the NDH in 1944.

He has had exhibitions in Zagreb, Beograd, Sisak, Maribor, Split, Brist, Sarajevo, Osijek, and Beirut. Veža has received many awards and honours, including the Vladimir Nazor Award in 1994.

References

External links

1916 births
2010 deaths
20th-century Croatian painters
Croatian male painters
21st-century Croatian painters
21st-century male artists
Vladimir Nazor Award winners
Academy of Fine Arts, University of Zagreb alumni
Yugoslav painters
20th-century Croatian male artists